William Luke Patching (born 18 October 1998) is an English professional footballer who plays as a midfielder for League of Ireland Premier Division club Derry City.

He joined Notts County from the Manchester City Academy in July 2018. He was released by County in August 2019, and joined Irish club Dundalk in November 2019.

A former youth team player with England up until under-18 level, participating at the 2015 FIFA U-17 World Cup.

Club career

Notts County
Born in Stockport, Patching joined the Academy at Manchester City at the age of six. He signed a two-year contract with Notts County on 1 July 2018. "Magpies" manager Kevin Nolan said that "when we spoke to a couple of people at Man City they were surprised Will had been released". Patching had rejected a transfer move to Derby County only six months previously. He picked up an injury in pre-season. He made his professional debut on 14 August, coming on as a 68th-minute substitute for Noor Husin in a 3–3 draw at Middlesbrough in the EFL Cup; County lost the subsequent shoot-out despite him converting his penalty. He made his first start at Meadow Lane on 9 October, in a 2–0 defeat to Newcastle United U21s in the EFL Trophy. He made a total of ten appearances during the 2018–19 campaign as County were relegated out of the English Football League with a 23rd-place finish in League Two. On 12 August 2019, manager Neal Ardley stated that Patching could go out on loan to gain experience and match fitness, but Patching left the club by mutual consent two days later.

Dundalk
He began training with Port Vale in August 2019, but was subsequently signed by League of Ireland Premier Division team Dundalk in November 2019 ahead of the 2020 season.

On 22 February 2021 it was announced that Patching had joined fellow League of Ireland Premier Division side Derry City initially on loan until July 2021, with the option to buy.

Upon his return to Dundalk, he scored in both legs to help defeat Newtown A.F.C. and FCI Levadia Tallinn in the 2021–22 UEFA Europa Conference League qualifying phase and play-off round.

Derry City
On 22 November 2021, it was announced that Patching had signed a two-year contract with Derry City following the expiry of his contract at Dundalk, from the 2022 season.

International career
Patching was selected by head coach Neil Dewsnip for England's under-17 squad for the 2015 FIFA U-17 World Cup in Chile, and came on as a substitute in the group stage draws with Guinea and South Korea.

Style of play
Port Vale assistant manager Dave Kevan described Patching as a "very promising young player" who was a very "creative" midfielder, "very comfortable in possession, [who] likes to join the front man and get forward".

Career statistics

References

1998 births
Living people
Footballers from Stockport
English footballers
England youth international footballers
Association football midfielders
Manchester City F.C. players
Notts County F.C. players
Dundalk F.C. players
Derry City F.C. players
English Football League players
League of Ireland players
Expatriate association footballers in the Republic of Ireland